Carlos Martinez (born January 21, 1992 in San Pedro, California) is an American soccer player currently unattached.

Career
Martinez began his career with FC Rot-Weiß Erfurt before transferring to FC Energie Cottbus. He signed his first professional contract with USL Pro club Sacramento Republic in March 2014.

Honors
Sacramento Republic
USL Cup: 2014

References

1992 births
Living people
American soccer players
Sacramento Republic FC players
Association football midfielders
USL Championship players
United States men's youth international soccer players